Love Makes a Family was a non-profit advocacy and assistance organization of families headed by LGBT people, and their friends, working for equal marriage and family rights in the United States. It was also the name of a former organization in Connecticut that disbanded in 2009 after achieving its aims.

Oregon
Love Makes a Family, Inc. was founded in 1992 by Bonnie Tinker as an outgrowth of the making of a video of the same name on lesbian and gay Quaker families, and incorporated in 1993 in connection with opposition to Ballot Measure 9 on the part of "a racially diverse group of sexual minorities in Oregon and Southwest Washington." It is headquartered in Portland, Oregon. Its activities began in support of families, with support groups for parents and children and then a talk show with Tinker on a Christian right-wing radio station, KKEY, a newsletter, a schools committee to speak with students and teachers, and increasing political activity. Based on Tinker's view that "meaningful social change doesn’t take place with 50 percent plus one, but rather when communities are transformed," the group also has booths at the Oregon State Fair for marriage equality and for non-violence, and continues Tinker's "Open Hearts and Minds" workshop since her death in an accident in July 2009.

Connecticut
Love Makes a Family of Connecticut or Love Makes a Family (Connecticut), Inc. was founded in 1999 as a coalition of organizations and individuals working for equal marriage rights for same-sex couples in Connecticut, using community education, grassroots organizing and legislative advocacy and lobbying.  Founded by five statewide organizations to pass a co-parent adoption law, it succeeded in 2000 in that and also in defeating a "Defense of Marriage Act", and therefore instead of disbanding, incorporated and made the legalization of gay marriage its new goal. After that goal was achieved, in November 2009 it dissolved and donated its records to the Yale University Library.

See also
LGBT parenting
Same-sex marriage in Connecticut
Same-sex marriage in Oregon

References

External links
Love Makes a Family main page, archived at the Internet Archive
Love Makes a Family (Connecticut) main page at the Internet Archive
Love Makes a Family: Gay Parents in the 90's by Daniel Veltri, Remco Kobus & Marla Leech (1991) at Fanlight Productions
Guide to the Love Makes a Family Records, Manuscripts and Archives, Yale University Library
Bonnie Tinker Papers, 1963-2009 held by Friends Historical Library of Swarthmore College

1992 establishments in Oregon
1999 establishments in Connecticut
2009 disestablishments in Connecticut
LGBT in Connecticut
LGBT political advocacy groups in Connecticut
LGBT in Oregon
LGBT parenting in the United States
LGBT political advocacy groups in the United States
Non-profit organizations based in Connecticut
Non-profit organizations based in Oregon
Organizations based in Portland, Oregon
Organizations disestablished in 2009
Organizations established in 1992
Organizations established in 1999